Abdiqani Mohamoud Ateye Farid is a Somalilander politician, who is currently serving as the Defence Minister of Somaliland since his appointment in 2019. He formerly served as the Minister of Justice of Somaliland from 2007.

See also

 List of Somaliland politicians
 Ministry of Defence (Somaliland)
 Ministry of Justice (Somaliland)
 List of Somalis

References

|-

People from Hargeisa
Living people
Peace, Unity, and Development Party politicians
Government ministers of Somaliland
Year of birth missing (living people)